The Powassan Voodoos are a Canadian junior "A" ice hockey team based out of Powassan, Ontario.  They are members of the Northern Ontario Junior Hockey League and play their home games at the Powassan Sportsplex.

History
The Voodoos were founded in 2014. The arrival of the team marks the return of junior hockey to Powassan for the first time since 1994, when the Powassan Hawks departed for Sturgeon Falls. The team signed an agreement with the North Bay Battalion of the Ontario Hockey League to serve as an official feeder to this squad. Scott Wray, a fifteen-year veteran who skated mainly in the ECHL was chosen as head coach. During the 2014–15 season, the Voodoos' first in the league, the club finished with a 15–29–0–8 record.

In only their second year of operation the Voodoos claimed their first regular season Division Championship. In their third year the team repeated as regular season division champions and added the overall regular season league champions and they swept the Blind River Beavers in four games in the finals to advance to the Dudley Hewitt Cup. They finished the round-robin with a record of 1–2–0 and advanced to the semifinals, which they lost to the Georgetown Raiders with a score of 2–1.

Prior to the 2017–18 season, Scott Wray was promoted to an assistant coach position with the Ontario Hockey League's North Bay Battalion and Beau Moyer was hired as the team's second head coach. However, he would be fired from the team during the season on 29 January following a league imposed suspension after he had violated a league rule involving drinking with a few players. Both Moyer and his father, who was present in the hotel bar, cited that they had not invited the players to the bar, who were of legal drinking age, but that the players came to the bar on their own and then joined the coaches. After Moyer was fired, assistant coach Bruce Cazabon became the interim coach. Max Gavin was hired as the head coach for the 2018–19 season. Gavin left the team in August 2020 and was not immediately replaced during the COVID-19 pandemic that had curtailed the previous season. Former Hearst Lumberjacks' head coach Mark Lafleur was hired as coach for the 2021–22 season.

Season-by-season records

Dudley Hewitt Cup
Central Canada ChampionshipsNOJHL – OJHL – SIJHL – HostRound robin play with second vs. third in semifinal to advance against first in the finals.

References

External links
Powassan Voodoos Web Page

Ice hockey teams in Ontario
Sport in Northern Ontario
2014 establishments in Ontario
Ice hockey clubs established in 2014